Walman or Walmann is a surname. Notable people with the surname include:

 Jake Walman (born 1996), Canadian-American professional ice hockey player
 Jerome Walman, American composer
 Aleksander Walmann (born 1986), Norwegian singer and songwriter

See also
 Valman (disambiguation)
 Wallman/Wallmann